Jim Scott is an American guitarist, singer-songwriter and composer in the genres of jazz, classical and folk music.

Life
Scott co-wrote Missa Gaia - Earth Mass and other pieces with the Paul Winter Consort. He has recorded many albums of original music, and collected and arranged The Earth and Spirit Songbook, an anthology of 110 songs of earth and peace by contemporary songwriters.

He has performed in all 50 states, England, Scotland, Italy, France, Greece, Australia, Nicaragua, Mexico and Canada. 
He also performed in Carnegie Hall, the Newport Jazz Festival (with the Paul Winter Consort), The Great Peace March for Global Nuclear Disarmament with Pete Seeger and Peter Yarrow.

His world tours have included a European tour with The Griffith Singers performing his choral music (in 1997), recording in the gardens of Findhorn, Scotland with jazz flautist Paul Horn, touring Nicaragua with Holly Near (in 1984), and performing in Australia for colleges and the Institute for Earth Education International Conference (in 1990).

He has also played on stage with  musicians John Denver, Tracy Chapman, Joan Baez, 10,000 Maniacs, Joni Mitchell, Jackson Browne, Dan Fogelberg, Odetta, Steve Gadd, Tony Levin, Nelson Rangell, Ed Tossing, and Tom Chapin.

Scott has been active in Unitarian Universalism, contributing hymns such as 'Gather the Spirit' and co-chairing the Seventh Principle Project, he was one of the creators of the Green Sanctuary program.

Discography
 1977 - Common Ground - Paul Winter Consort. A&M Records
 1980 - Callings - Paul Winter Consort. Living Music
 1981 - Jim Scott Alone - Jim Scott
 1982 - A Song for the Earth - Radiance
 1982 - Lake Unto The Clouds - Radiance
 1983 - Inverness - Radiance
 1981 - Missa Gaia/Earth Mass - Paul Winter Consort. Living Music
 1984 - A Concert for the Earth (Live at the U N) - Paul Winter Consort and the Back Bay Chorale of Boston. Living Music
 1985 - The First Winds of Autumn - Jim Scott
 1986 - Big and Little Stuff: Songs for Kids - Jim Scott
 1989 - The Tree and Me - Jim Scott
 1989 - Wolf Eyes - Paul Winter Consort. Living Music
 1995 - Earth Sky Love and Dreams - Jim Scott
 1996 - For A Time - Jim Scott
 1997 - Sailing With the Moon - Jim Scott
 1999 - Body and Soul (Soundtrack - documentary series on PBS Television)
 2001 - Instruments of Peace - Radiance
 2007 - Gather the Spirit - Jim Scott and Friends with the Master Singers To Go Choir, Matthew Johnsen, Director

References

External links
 Official website
 Facebook.com

American jazz guitarists
American session musicians
American jazz composers
American singer-songwriters
American anti-war activists
Living people
Year of birth missing (living people)
American Unitarian Universalists
American anti–nuclear weapons activists
American male guitarists
American male jazz composers
Paul Winter Consort members
American male singer-songwriters